Robert Marino Riti (born December 2, 1976) is a former American football center who played college football at the University of Missouri and attended Hazelwood West High School in Hazelwood, Missouri. He was a consensus All-American in 1999.

Early years
Riti participated in football, wrestling and track and field for the Hazelwood West High School Wildcats, lettering in all three sports.. He was a two time All-Suburban North Conference selection and was selected to the All-Metro team. He was recruited by Stanford University, Michigan State University, Air Force and Army. Riti was inducted in Hazelwood West High School's Hall of Fame in 2013.

College career
Riti played college football for the Missouri Tigers. He was redshirted his freshman year of 1995 and played on the defensive line. He was moved to the offensive line in 1996, starting eight games at right guard and one at left guard. Riti transitioned to center in 1997, starting in all of Missouri's games. He was an All-Big 12 selection in 1998 and 1999. He was also consensus first-team All-American in 1999. Riti also squatted 1,000 pounds as a Missouri Tiger.

Professional career

St Louis Rams
Riti was signed by the St. Louis Rams in April 2000 after going undrafted in the 2000 NFL Draft. He was released by the Rams in August 2000.

References

External links
NFL Draft Scout

Living people
1976 births
Players of American football from St. Louis
American football centers
Missouri Tigers football players
All-American college football players